Scott Clayton and Adil Shamasdin were the defending champions but only Clayton chose to defend his title, partnering Liam Broady. Clayton lost in the quarterfinals to Manuel Guinard and Arthur Rinderknech.

Guinard and Rinderknech won the title after defeating Roberto Cid Subervi and Gonçalo Oliveira 7–6(7–4), 7–6(7–3) in the final.

Seeds

Draw

References

External links
 Main draw

Challenger Banque Nationale de Drummondville - Doubles
2020 Doubles